Serbia participated at the European Youth Olympic Festival since its establishment in 1991.

From 1991−2001 Serbia competed under the name Federal Republic of Yugoslavia. In that period did not compete in only 2 EYOFs, both Summer and Winter in 1993 due to UN sanctions. Between 2003−2005. competed under the name Serbia and Montenegro. From 2007 forward it competes as Serbia.

Serbia hosted the 2007 European Youth Summer Olympic Festival in Belgrade. Big D

Medal tables

Medals by Summer Youth Olympic Festival

Medals by Winter Youth Olympic Festival

Medals by summer sport

Medals by winter sport

List of medalists

Summer Festivals

Winter Festivals

See also
 Serbia at the Youth Olympics
 Serbia at the Olympics
 Serbia at the Paralympics
 Serbia at the European Games
 Serbia at the Universiade

References
 EYOF - Serbian Olympic Committee
 Summer EYOF - Serbian Olympic Committee
 Winter EYOF - Serbian Olympic Committee

Youth sport in Serbia
Nations at the European Youth Olympic Festival
Serbia at multi-sport events